"From the Bottom of My Heart" is a 2006 single by Stevie Wonder from his 2005 album A Time 2 Love. The song peaked at #25 on the U.S. Adult Contemporary chart and #52 on the Hot R&B/Hip-Hop Songs chart. It won the 2006 Grammy Award for Best Male Pop Vocal Performance.

Chart performance

References

2006 singles
Stevie Wonder songs
Grammy Award for Best Male Pop Vocal Performance
Songs written by Stevie Wonder
Song recordings produced by Stevie Wonder
2005 songs